Ryan Richard Alatiit Eigenmann (born July 22, 1977) is a Filipino actor.

Early life
Eigenmann is one of the third generation of the Mesa-Gil clan of actors. His grandparents are musician Eddie Mesa and actress Rosemarie Gil. He is the son of Filipino actors Michael de Mesa and Gina Alajar. His father has Swiss German American and Spanish ancestry and his mother is of part Chinese descent. He is the nephew of Filipino actors Cherie and Mark Gil. He has two younger brothers who are also actors, Geoff and AJ.

Education
Eigenmann studied at Montessori, International Christian Academy and De La Salle–College of Saint Benilde.

Personal life
He is married to Cathy Bordalba, a TV host and former commercial model. Their wedding took place February 28, 2010 in Coconut Palace. They have three children.

Filmography

Film

Television

Awards and nominations

References

External links

1977 births
Ateneo de Manila University alumni
Living people
20th-century Filipino male actors
Filipino male child actors
Star Magic
Filipino male television actors
Filipino people of Kapampangan descent
Ryan
Filipino people of American descent
Filipino people of Chinese descent
Filipino people of German descent
Filipino people of Spanish descent
Filipino people of Swiss descent
21st-century Filipino male actors
People from Capiz
Visayan people
GMA Network personalities
ABS-CBN personalities
TV5 (Philippine TV network) personalities
Filipino male film actors
De La Salle–College of Saint Benilde alumni